Red Dirt Radio is a radio station that broadcasts to the Childers, Queensland community on the frequency of 88.0 MHz.

The station is fully automated.

References

Radio stations in Queensland